UAAP Season 58 is the 1995–96 athletic year of the University Athletic Association of the Philippines, which was hosted by the Ateneo de Manila University.

It was first aired on PTV-4, it produced by Silverstar Sports.

Basketball

Men's tournament

Team standings

Playoffs

Overall championship race

Juniors' division

Seniors' division

External links